The Union of Mladorossi (Soyuz Mladorossov) was a political group of Russian émigré monarchists (mostly living in Europe) who advocated a hybrid of Russian monarchy and the Soviet system, best evidenced by their motto "Tsar and the Soviets". 

The organization started in 1923, as the "Union of Young Russia" (in Russian: Союз Молодой России, Soyuz Molodoi Rossii) in Munich, changing its name to the Union of Mladorossi in 1925.

Early years 
The Mladorossi, as they were popularly known, at first declared themselves as anti-communists. In contrast to other émigré political organizations, they argued against the idea of creating a "free Russia" on non-Russian soil, believing strongly that what they called "Soviet-occupied Russia" was the only Russia that could be in existence. The Mladorossi believed that the Soviet government, for all its negative ideology, was preserving the Russian state and defending its national interests. They also believed that the October Revolution was merely the beginning of an evolutionary process that would create a new, young Russia (hence their use of the prefix mlado which means "young").

Similar groups 
Several émigré movements with a similar ideology evolved at around the same time, notably the Evraziitsi, and the Smenovekhovtsi. Other émigré movements and organizations, such as National Alliance of Russian Solidarists (NTS), the Russian Imperial Union Order, and the ROVS, were hostile to these movements, feeling they were trying to justify the October Revolution and reconcile with the Bolsheviks.

Ideology 

The Mladorossi organization had a fascist influence as demonstrated by its doctrine and as visible through its use of the Roman salute popularized by the Italian fascist dictator Benito Mussolini to salute its leader (renounced when Hitler launched Operation Barbarossa). Alexander Kazembek saw from fascism the combination of traditionalism, ultra-nationalism, anti-communism, as well as the desire to lean on the masses hence the imitation of the Italian fascists. Kazembek also was in some sort of contact with Mussolini. 

In 1933 Kazembek attended a conference in Berlin where he signed a cooperation pact with Anastasy Vonsiatsky's All-Russian Fascist Organisation and Pavel Bermondt-Avalov's Russian National Socialist Movement, this was motivated by the Nazi Party's anti-communist stance however when this evolved into anti-Russian sentiment the Mladorossi denounced Nazism with its general secretary, Kirill Elita-Vilchkovsky, referring to the ideology as "Satanic-fascism".

The Mladorossi were also monarchist oriented. They recognized Grand Duke Kirill Vladimirovich of Russia as the legitimate heir of the Russian throne and the latter became supportive of the organization.

William Seabrook noted that while Mladorossi were Tsarist, they seemed almost "Red" to conservative Russians because of their leftist views.

Collapse 
In the 1930s, the Mladorossi adopted an increasingly open pro-Soviet position, claiming that they were to become the "second Soviet party". While still declaring Stalin as their enemy, the Mladorossi believed that a tsar could fully function in the Soviet system that was in place at the time in the USSR. This earned the Mladorossi the label of being "Soviet patriots" amidst the White émigrés, and speculation began that the organization was being influenced, if not controlled, by the Soviet secret police.

The founder of the Mladorossi, Alexander Kazembek, was implicated of having ties with the Soviet consulate and the OGPU. In 1937, after being spotted in a cafe in France speaking to several Soviet diplomats, Kazembek resigned his post. After World War II, he emigrated to the United States and lived in California and then Connecticut and then moved to the USSR, where he lived out the rest of his years. 

At the start of World War II, many Mladorossi volunteered to join the French Resistance. After the war ended, the organisation dissolved and was no longer heard of.

See also
Carlist Party
Inner Line 
National Alliance of Russian Solidarists
Russian All-Military Union
Serbian Radical Party
White émigré

References

 (1994) The Mission of the Russian Emigration, M.V. Nazarov. Moscow: Rodnik. 

1923 establishments in Russia
1945 disestablishments in the Soviet Union
Organizations established in 1923
Organizations disestablished in 1945
Russian nationalist organizations
Organizations of the Russian Revolution
White Russian emigration
Syncretic political movements
Fascism in Russia
Anti-communist organizations
National Bolshevik parties
Monarchist parties in Russia